Francis Beattie Brewer (October 8, 1820 – July 29, 1892) was a physician and an American politician and a U.S. Representative from New York.

Biography
Born in Keene, New Hampshire, Brewer was the son of Ebenezer and Julia Emerson Brewer and attended the Barnet, Vermont public schools, Newbury (Vermont) Seminary, and Kimball Union Academy in Meriden, New Hampshire. He was graduated from Dartmouth College, Hanover, New Hampshire, in 1843 and from the medical department of the same institution in 1846. He married Caroline Elizabeth Selden.

Career
Brewer practiced medicine in Barnet, Vermont, Plymouth, Massachusetts, and Titusville, Pennsylvania, from 1849 to 1861. He was a pioneer oil operator and lumberman in Titusville. He moved to Westfield, New York, in 1861 and engaged in banking, manufacturing, and agricultural pursuits.

During the Civil War, Brewer was a state military agent with the rank of major. He served as member of the board of supervisors of Chautauqua County, New York from 1868 to 1879, and was a delegate to the 1872 Republican National Convention. He served a member of the New York State Assembly (Chautauqua County, 1st District) in 1873 and 1874. He was the government director of the Union Pacific Railroad for four years under Presidents Grant and Hayes. He was appointed manager of the state insane asylum, Buffalo, New York, in 1881.

Elected as a Republican to the Forty-eighth Congress Brewer was United States Representative for the thirty-third district of New York from March 4, 1883 to March 3, 1885. Not a candidate for reelection in 1884. He resumed the practice of medicine.

Death
Brewer died in Westfield, Chautauqua County, New York, on July 29, 1892 (age 71 years, 295 days). He is interred at Allegheny Cemetery, Pittsburgh, Pennsylvania.

References

External links

The Political Graveyard
Govtrack US Congress

1820 births
1892 deaths
Dartmouth College alumni
Union Army officers
Republican Party members of the New York State Assembly
People from Westfield, New York
Republican Party members of the United States House of Representatives from New York (state)
People from Keene, New Hampshire
Burials at Allegheny Cemetery
19th-century American politicians